The molecular formula C23H29N3O (molar mass: 363.49 g/mol, exact mass: 363.2311 u) may refer to:

 Pirolazamide (SC-26,438)
 Opipramol
 Necopidem 

Molecular formulas